Canada competed at the 1976 Winter Olympics in Innsbruck, Austria. Canada has competed at every Winter Olympic Games.

Medalists

Alpine skiing

Men

Women

Bobsleigh

Cross-country skiing

Men

Men's 4 × 10 km relay

Women

Women's 4 × 5 km relay

Figure skating

Men

Women

Pairs

Ice Dancing

Luge

Men

(Men's) Doubles

Women

Nordic combined 

Events:
 normal hill ski jumping (Three jumps, best two counted and shown here.)
 15 km cross-country skiing

Ski jumping

Speed skating

Men

Women

References

 Olympic Winter Games 1976, full results by sports-reference.com

Nations at the 1976 Winter Olympics
1976
Winter Olympics